"How Could You" is an R&B song performed by American recording artist Mario and is the second single from his second studio album Turning Point (2004). It was written by Antonio Dixon, Eric Dawkins, J. Valentine and the Underdogs (Damon Thomas and Harvey Mason, Jr.), who also produced the song. Released on February 14, 2005, the single reached number 52 on the US Billboard Hot 100. "How Could You" also debuted on the Australian Singles Chart at number 43. The official remix of the song was produced by Scott Storch and Dr. Dre.

Chart performance
"How Could You" debuted at number 93 on the Billboard Hot 100 for the week of March 19, 2005, while "Let Me Love You" was number 3 on that chart. Eight weeks later, it peaked at number 52 the week of May 14, remaining on the chart for seventeen weeks.

Music video
The video was directed by Benny Boom with a cameo appearance in the video by rapper Cassidy, JD Williams, and by actress Ambrosia Williams.

Track listing
Australian CD single
 "How Could You" (dirty version)
 "How Could You" (Scott Storch remix club version)
 "Couldn't Say No"
 "How Could You" (video)

Charts

Weekly charts

Year-end charts

Release history

References

2004 songs
2005 singles
Mario (singer) songs
J Records singles
Music videos directed by Benny Boom
Song recordings produced by the Underdogs (production team)
Songs written by Antonio Dixon (songwriter)
Songs written by Damon Thomas (record producer)
Songs written by Eric Dawkins
Songs written by Harvey Mason Jr.
Songs written by J. Valentine